Qarah Aghaj (also Romanized as Qarah Āghāj and Qareh Āghāj) is a village in Baranduzchay-ye Shomali Rural District, in the Central District of Urmia County, West Azerbaijan Province, Iran. At the 2006 census, its population was 1,554, in 413 families.

References 

Populated places in Urmia County